Tomás mac Muircheartaigh Ó Ceallaigh, O.P., Archbishop of Tuam, 1438 to 1441.

Bishop Ó Ceallaigh was translated from the see of Clonfert in 1438. He was a member of the Ui Maine dynasty of south-east Connacht.

The History of the Popes says he:

was translated to Tuam by the Pope. He is spoken of as being a man eminent for piety and liberality.

References

External links
 http://www.ucc.ie/celt/published/T100005B/
 http://www.ucc.ie/celt/published/T100005C/
 https://archive.org/stream/fastiecclesiaehi04cottuoft#page/n17/mode/2up

Archbishops of Tuam
People from County Galway
15th-century Roman Catholic archbishops in Ireland
Bishops of Clonfert